Josephine "Joan" Davis (June 29, 1907 – May 22, 1961) was an American comedic actress whose career spanned vaudeville, film, radio, and television. Remembered best for the 1950s television comedy I Married Joan, Davis had a successful earlier career as a B-movie actress and a leading star of 1940s radio comedy.

Born in Saint Paul, Minnesota, she was the only child of LeRoy Davis and Nina Mae (née Sinks) Davis, who were married in St. Paul on November 23, 1910. Davis had been a performer since childhood. She appeared with her husband Si Wills in vaudeville.

Career

Films

Davis' first film was a short subject for Educational Pictures titled Way Up Thar (1935), featuring a then-unknown Roy Rogers. Educational's distribution company, Twentieth Century-Fox, signed Davis for feature films. Tall and lanky, with a comically flat speaking voice, she became known as one of the few female physical clowns of her time. Perhaps best known for her co-starring turn with Bud Abbott and Lou Costello in Hold That Ghost (1941), she had a reputation for flawless physical comedy.

Her pantomime sequence in Beautiful but Broke (1944) was a slapstick construction-site episode. She also featured in Tail Spin (1939) as a supporting actor, for the women's Bendix Air Race circuit. She co-starred with Eddie Cantor in Show Business (1944) and If You Knew Susie (1948).

Radio

Joan Davis entered radio with an August 28, 1941, appearance on The Rudy Vallee Show and became a regular on that show four months later. Davis then began a series of shows that established her as a top star of radio situation comedy throughout the 1940s. When Vallee left for the Coast Guard in 1943, Davis and Jack Haley became the co-hosts of the show. With a title change to The Sealtest Village Store, Davis was the owner-operator of the store from July 8, 1943, to June 28, 1945 when she left to do Joanie's Tea Room on CBS from September 3, 1945 to June 23, 1947. Sponsored by Lever Brothers on behalf of Swan Soap, the premise had Davis running a tea shop in the little community of Smallville. The supporting cast featured Verna Felton. Harry von Zell was the announcer, and her head writer was Abe Burrows, formerly the head writer (and co-creator) of Duffy's Tavern and eventually a Broadway playwright.

The tea shop setting continued in Joan Davis Time, a CBS Saturday-night series from October 11, 1947, to July 3, 1948. With Lionel Stander as the tea shop manager, the cast included Hans Conried, Mary Jane Croft, Andy Russell, the Choraliers quintet, and John Rarig and his Orchestra. Leave It to Joan ran from July 4 to August 22, 1949, as a summer replacement for Lux Radio Theater and continued from September 9, 1949, to March 3, 1950. She was  heard on CBS July 3 through August 28, 1950. She was a frequent and popular performer on Tallulah Bankhead's radio variety show The Big Show (1950–1952). Davis was also a regular on Eddie Cantor's Time to Smile program.

Television
Davis was the star of the unsold pilot Let's Join Joanie, recorded in 1950. The proposed series was a television adaptation of Leave It to Joan. When I Love Lucy premiered in October 1951 and became a top-rated TV series, sponsors wanted more of the same. I Married Joan premiered in 1952, casting Davis as the manic wife of a mild-mannered community judge (Jim Backus), who got her husband into wacky jams with or without the help of a younger sister, played by her real-life daughter Beverly Wills. Davis was also one of the show's executive producers. I Married Joan did not achieve the ratings success enjoyed by I Love Lucy, but during its first two years, it received moderately successful ratings, even cracking the top 25 for the 1953–1954 season. However, by the start of its third year, not only were the ratings beginning to slip, but Davis began experiencing heart trouble. As a result, the series was canceled in Spring 1955. I Married Joan experienced greater success in syndication; it was one of the early series to take advantage of that avenue.

After Davis's death in spring of 1961, I Married Joan was pulled from syndication until litigation over her estate, including her residuals from the show's syndicated reruns, could be settled in court (an issue complicated by the deaths of all of her next of kin in 1963).

In 1956, a year after I Married Joan ended its primetime run, Davis was approached by ABC to star in The Joan Davis Show. The premise of this series had Davis playing a musical comedy entertainer who had raised a daughter on her own. Davis used her real name as the lead character. Veteran actress Hope Summers was cast as Joan's housekeeper, and Wills was signed to play Joan's daughter, also named Beverly. Ray Ferrell was cast as Joan's grandson Stevie. In the pilot, Joan was introduced to her five-year-old grandson for the first time and was trying to convince Beverly, despite her hectic show-business schedule and her somewhat zany personality, that she was a loving and responsible grandmother. The pilot did not sell as a series for ABC. It was forgotten among Davis' television work until many years later when the Museum of Television and Radio in New York discovered the program and added it to its collection.

Death
On May 22, 1961, Davis died of a heart attack at the age of 53 at her home in Palm Springs, California. She was interred in the Holy Cross Cemetery mausoleum in Culver City, California. On October 24, 1963, Davis' mother, daughter Beverly Wills, and two grandchildren were all killed in a house fire in Palm Springs.

Joan Davis has two stars on the Hollywood Walk of Fame, one for her contribution to the motion picture industry at 1501 Vine Street and one for radio in the 1700 block of Vine.

Filmography

Award nominations

See also
 Golden Age of Television
 Let's Join Joanie (failed pilot with Joan Davis)

References

Further reading
 Ohmart, Ben. Hold That Joan – The Life, Laughs & Films of Joan Davis. Albany: BearManor Media, 2007. 
 Rapp, Philip. The Television Scripts of Philip Rapp. Albany: BearManor Media, 2006. .
 Karol, Michael. Sitcom Queens: Divas of the Small Screen. iUniverse, 2006. pp. 22–24. .

External links

 
 
 Literature on Joan Davis

1907 births
1961 deaths
20th-century American actresses
20th Century Studios contract players
Actresses from Saint Paul, Minnesota
American film actresses
American television actresses
Television producers from California
American women television producers
American stage actresses
American radio actresses
American women comedians
Burials at Holy Cross Cemetery, Culver City
Actresses from Palm Springs, California
Vaudeville performers
20th-century American businesspeople
20th-century American businesswomen
Comedians from California
20th-century American comedians